Reipas Lahti is a sports club based in Lahti, Finland. It is involved in various of ball games and also other sports. The club emerged in the late 1940s, when the inhabitants of Viipuri had mostly been relocated in Lahti, after evacuation during World War II. As a consequence, the activities of Viipurin Reipas, which had been founded in 1891, were continued in the new home town of the evacuees. The name of the club was still Reipas Viipuri until 1962, when the ball game section became simply Reipas.

Reipas has played in top-flight football, ice hockey and bandy, with particular success in football.

In bandy, Reipas last appeared in top flight in 1967, but then discontinued its involvement in this sport the following year. In 1975, the football and ice hockey sections became independent clubs, football being continued under the name of Lahden Reipas, and ice hockey under the name of Kiekkoreipas, who now play as Pelicans.

Football

The hallmark of Reipas in football is a shirt with vertical orange and black stripes.

From 1963 to 1970, Reipas won the Mestaruussarja three time, thus achieving a hat trick of Finnish championships. However, by 1996 the club was in financial difficulties, and the problem was solved by merging Reipas and they more recently arrived local rival Kuusysi. At the time both clubs played in the northern section of Division 1, i.e. on the second level, but at the end of the season Reipas found themselves in the relegation zone.

FC Lahti
The new club was simply called FC Lahti, and it inherited Kuusysi's place in Division 1, now in the southern section. The place of Reipas, in 1997 Kakkonen was given to FC Pallo-Lahti, which was founded as a reserves team. Later this team was discontinued and the place in the division in question was given up.

FC Reipas
Together with the other changes, a club named FC Reipas was founded in 1996. Its task is to continue the tradition of bringing up new generations of footballers in Lahti, more specifically A and B juniors. Nowadays the club has teams in all age groups.

The club also has an elderly men's team.

The club organises the annual Lahti Soccer tournament.

Return of Reipas Lahti
Lahden Reipas, i.e. Reipas Lahti returned to men's competitive football for the season 2012, when it was given the former place of Reipas Salpausselkä in Division 3.

Season to season

                                                                                                                                                                                                                                       
27 seasons in Veikkausliiga
19 seasons in Ykkönen
16 seasons in Kakkonen
7 seasons in Kolmonen

Honours in football
Finnish champion (3):
1963, 1967, 1970
Finnish Cup (7):
1964, 1972, 1973, 1974, 1975, 1976, 1978
Finnish Cup runners-up (3):
1963, 1967, 1970

References

External links
Reipas Lahti homepages
FC Reipas homepages
Reipas Lahti and Veikkausliiga web exhibition by Sports Museum Foundation of Finland.

Football clubs in Finland
Reipas Viipuri
Reipas Viipuri
Reipas Viipuri
Sport in Vyborg
Sport in Lahti

it:Lahden Reipas
lt:Reipas Lahti